Die seltsamen Methoden des Franz Josef Wanninger is a German television series.

See also
List of German television series

External links
 

German crime television series
1960s German police procedural television series
1970s German police procedural television series
1980s German police procedural television series
Television shows set in Munich
1970s German television series
1965 German television series debuts
1982 German television series endings
German-language television shows
Das Erste original programming